Knights & Emeralds is a 1986 British drama film written and directed by Ian Emes. The film stars Christopher Wild, Beverly Hills, Warren Mitchell, Bill Leadbitter, Rachel Davies and Tracie Bennett. The film was released by Warner Bros. on 11 October 1986.

Plot
In Wolverhampton two rival marching bands compete, while the teens within them have rivalries of their own, some racial, some sexual..

Cast

Box office
Goldcrest Films invested £1,113,000 in the film and received £340,000, losing the company £773,000.

References

External links
 

1986 films
British drama films
1986 drama films
Warner Bros. films
Films directed by Ian Emes
1980s English-language films
1980s British films